Loïc Corbery (born 9 June 1976) is a French actor and theatre director. He joined the Comédie-Française in 2005 and has been a sociétaire since 2010.

Filmography

References

External links 

 
 Official website

1976 births
Living people
French male film actors
20th-century French male actors
21st-century French male actors
Sociétaires of the Comédie-Française
French male stage actors
French male television actors
Actors from Avignon